Bror Yngve Sjöstedt (August 3, 1866, Hjo – 1948) was a Swedish naturalist.

Sjöstedt gained his degree and his doctorate in 1896 at the University of Uppsala. He worked as an assistant in Statens Entomologiska Anstalt  from 1897 to 1902, becoming  a Professor and  a Curator in the Swedish Museum of Natural History. He made several expeditions to the west and east of  Africa, including Kilimanjaro and edited Wissenschaftliche Ergebnisse der Schwedischen Zoologischen Expedition nach dem Kilimandjaro, dem Meru und umgebenden Massaisteppen Deutsch-Osatafrikas 1905–1906. 2 Band, Abt. 8. Stockholm: K. Schwed. Akad.(1907–1910)

References

Anthony Musgrave (1932). Bibliography of Australian Entomology, 1775-1930, with biographical notes on authors and collectors, Royal Zoological Society of New South Wales (Sydney) : viii + 380.

External links
Schwedische Bibliothekskatalog Libris Works by Sjöstedt

Swedish entomologists
Swedish ornithologists
Swedish zoologists
Swedish botanists
1866 births
1948 deaths
People from Hjo Municipality